Stijn Vreven (born 18 July 1973) is a Belgian former professional football and a former manager of AS Trenčín in the Fortuna Liga.

Career
Vreven's career began when he signed a professional contract with Y.R. K.V. Mechelen, making his first first-team appearance in 1993, at the age of 20. After four seasons in Mechelen he moved to K.A.A. Gent where he developed into a better player for another two seasons. Then he made the step abroad to play for Dutch side FC Utrecht. In four seasons Vreven developed from an unknown player into a hero among the FC Utrecht supporters. He's known for his determination and aggressiveness, which gave him the status of a real killer on the pitch. After his period in Utrecht he moved to Germany to play for Bundesliga side 1. FC Kaiserslautern. He was not able to become a first team regular and returned to The Netherlands the year after where he played for Vitesse Arnhem. At Vitesse he showed that he still had the same determination and became a regular from the start. When criticising his own team mates in December 2005 manager Edward Sturing placed Vreven in Vitesse's second team. A few weeks later he left the team to sign a new contract at AC Omonia in Cyprus. After playing just six matches he returned to The Netherlands once again, where he joined ADO Den Haag.

In March 2007, Vreven was diagnosed with diabetes (type 1). This did not stop him, however, from continuing to play football. In August 2007, Vreven played for Sint-Truiden and joined in January 2008 K.S.K. Tongeren on loan.  He returned in summer 2008 to K. Sint-Truidense V.V. and moved to K.E.S.K. Leopoldsburg. In November 2010 he left K.E.S.K. Leopoldsburg and signed a contract as player-coach by KFC Esperanza Neerpelt.

From 2012 till June 2015 he was the coach of K.F.C. Dessel Sport. He was the coach of Waasland-Beveren from July 2015 to October 2016.

Honours
Utrecht
KNVB Cup: 2002–03

References

External links

1973 births
Living people
Belgian footballers
Belgium international footballers
Belgium youth international footballers
Belgium under-21 international footballers
Association football defenders
K.V. Mechelen players
K.A.A. Gent players
FC Utrecht players
1. FC Kaiserslautern players
SBV Vitesse players
AC Omonia players
ADO Den Haag players
Sint-Truidense V.V. players
Belgian Pro League players
Belgian football managers
Belgian expatriate football managers
NAC Breda managers
Eredivisie players
Bundesliga players
Cypriot First Division players
Belgian expatriate footballers
Expatriate footballers in the Netherlands
Belgian expatriate sportspeople in the Netherlands
Expatriate footballers in Germany
Belgian expatriate sportspeople in Germany
Expatriate footballers in Cyprus
Belgian expatriate sportspeople in Cyprus
Sportspeople from Hasselt
Footballers from Limburg (Belgium)
K.S.K. Tongeren players
K.S.C. Lokeren Oost-Vlaanderen managers
Lommel S.K. managers
AS Trenčín managers
Expatriate football managers in Slovakia
Belgian expatriate sportspeople in Slovakia
Slovak Super Liga managers